Zacharias Hildebrandt (1688, Münsterberg, Silesia – 11 October 1757, Dresden, Saxony) was a German organ builder. In 1714 his father Heinrich Hildebrandt, a cartwright master, apprenticed him to the famous organbuilder Gottfried Silbermann, brother of Andreas Silbermann in Freiberg. In 1721 Hildebrandt finished his masterpiece, the organ of the Nikolaikirche of Langhennersdorf, a small village near Freiberg. Afterwards he built an organ in Störmthal near Leipzig (where befriended Johann Sebastian Bach) and from 1724 to 1726 an organ in Lengefeld. On this project, a dispute developed with Gottfried Silbermann, who treated him as a rival and sued him. The dispute was settled by an agreement in which Hildebrandt obliged himself to take over only orders rejected by Silbermann.  Therefore, he moved his work to the region near Leipzig and to Thuringia. J.S. Bach thought Hildebrandt was the best organ builder of his time.

Hildebrandt's largest organ has 3 manuals and a pedalboard with 53 stops, and is located in the church of St. Wenzel in Naumburg an der Saale. Built from 1743 to 1746, in the 27th of September of the latter year, examinations were carried out by Silbermann and Bach. Hildebrandt had resorted to advice from the latter for its stoplist. The organ which had been rebuilt several times since then has been completely restored from 1993 to 2000 by Eule Orgelbau, and is commonly deemed Hildebrandt's magnum opus.

His son Johann Gottfried Hildebrandt (1724 or 1725 – 1775) was also an organbuilder.

Organ list
He constructed the following organs:

External links 
 
 Association for reconstructing the Hildebrandt organ in Lengefeld
 Official site of Hildebrandt organ in St. Wenzel church in Naumburg

1688 births
1757 deaths
People from Ziębice
People from Austrian Silesia
German pipe organ builders